The First Italo-Senussi War (1911–17) was a conflict between the Kingdom of Italy and the Senussi for control of Libya, primarily in Cyrenaica. It had two main active phases:
The Italo-Turkish War (1911–12), when Italy invaded Libya, then the Ottoman vilayet of Trâblus Gârb
The Senussi Campaign (1915–17), part of the First World War, in which Italian and British forces fought the Ottoman- and German-supported Senussi

After a period of relative peace, the Second Italo-Senussi War broke out in 1923 and lasted until 1932.

Notes

Italian colonisation in Africa
Italian Libya